Bernhard Klosterkemper (17 April 1897 – 19 July 1962) was a German general (Generalmajor) in the Wehrmacht during World War II and a recipient of the Knight's Cross of the Iron Cross of Nazi Germany. Klosterkemper surrendered to Allied troops in May 1945 and was released in 1947.

Awards and decorations
 Iron Cross (1914)
 2nd Class on 4 February 1918
 1st Class on 1 October 1918
 Wound Badge (1918) in Black on 11 May 1918
 Honour Cross of the World War 1914/1918 on 6 November 1934
 Sudetenland Medal with Prague Castle Bar
 Iron Cross (1939)
 2nd Class on 15 April 1940
 1st Class on 9 June 1940
 West Wall Medal on 22 November 1940
 Knight's Cross of the Iron Cross on 4 July 1944 as Oberst and commander of Grenadier-Regiment 920

References

Citations

Bibliography

1897 births
1962 deaths
German Army personnel of World War I
German prisoners of war in World War II
Major generals of the German Army (Wehrmacht)
People from Coesfeld
People from the Province of Westphalia
Recipients of the clasp to the Iron Cross, 1st class
Recipients of the Knight's Cross of the Iron Cross
Military personnel from North Rhine-Westphalia
German Army generals of World War II